The Know may refer to:

The Know (TV program), an Australian television talk show
The Know, an entertainment news division of Rooster Teeth
The Know (Portland, Oregon), a bar in the United States
The Know, a 2003 novel by Martina Cole
 Know (album), a 2018 album by American singer-songwriter Jason Mraz
 The Know (band), a Los Angeles-based band